Jonquières-Saint-Vincent is a commune in the Gard department in southern France.

Population

Twin towns — sister cities
Jonquières-Saint-Vincent is twinned with Vezza d'Alba, France.

See also
Communes of the Gard department
 Costières de Nîmes AOC

References

Communes of Gard